Miltons, Minas e Mais  is the fifth studio album by Brazilian Acoustic rock musician Emmerson Nogueira. In this album, Emmerson explores the music from his state (Minas Gerais), by covering songs from famous Mineiros musicians: Beto Guedes, Lô Borges, Milton Nascimento and 14 Bis.

Track listing

2005 albums
Emmerson Nogueira albums